The following are the national records in Olympic weightlifting in Botswana. Records are maintained in each weight class for the snatch lift, clean and jerk lift, and the total for both lifts by the Botswana Bodybuilding, Weightlifting and Fitness Association.

Men

Women

References

Botswana
weightlifting